Mona's Isle may refer to:

Places 
  Isle of Man, a self-governing British Crown Dependency, located in the Irish Sea between the islands of Great Britain and Ireland
 Isla de Mona, an island off Puerto Rico in the Caribbean
 Ynys Môn, ("Mona's Isle") the Welsh name for Anglesey

Ships 
 , a wooden paddle steamer operated by the Isle of Man Steam Packet Company
 , an iron paddle steamer operated by the Isle of Man Steam Packet Company, sank in a storm in Liverpool Bay in 1909
 , a paddle steamer operated by the Isle of Man Steam Packet Company until she was purchased by The Admiralty in 1915
 , a packet steamer operated by the South Eastern & Chatham Railway Company and the Isle of Man Steam Packet Company
 , a passenger vessel operated by the Isle of Man Steam Packet Company
 , a roll on - roll off car and passenger ferry operated by the Isle of Man Steam Packet Company